Zabaltzen is a political party in the Chartered Community of Navarre (Basque Country) formed in 2011.

History
Zabaltzen was created in 2011 by ex-members of Eusko Alkartasuna and Aralar, that opposed the merge of those parties in Bildu, and supported continuing in Nafarroa Bai. Zabaltzen participated in the creation of Geroa Bai in 2012.

References

Political parties in the Basque Country (autonomous community)
Political parties in Navarre
Basque nationalism
Political parties established in 2011
2011 establishments in Navarre
Aralar (Basque political party)